Geysir, sometimes known as The Great Geysir, is a geyser in southwestern Iceland. It was the first geyser described in a printed source and the first known to modern Europeans. The English word geyser (a periodically spouting hot spring) derives from Geysir. The name Geysir itself is derived from the Icelandic verb geysa ("to gush").

However, eruptions may be infrequent, and have in the past stopped altogether for many years at a time.

History

The research of sinter shows that Geysir has been active for approximately 10,000 years. The oldest accounts of hot springs at Haukadalur date back to 1294, when earthquakes in the area caused significant changes in local neighbouring landscape creating several new hot springs. Changes in the activity of Geysir and the surrounding geysers are strongly related to earthquake activity. In records dated 1630, the geysers erupted so violently that the valley around them trembled. The placename "Geysir" has been first mentioned in written sources in 18th century and, as unusual natural phenomena were of high interest to the society during the Age of Enlightenment, the term became popular and has been used for similar hydrothermal features worldwide since then.

In 1846, the research of Geysir by the German chemist Robert Bunsen resulted with the explanation of the mechanism of geyser activity.

History of recent centuries shows that earthquakes have tended to revive the activity of Geysir which then subsides again in the following years. In 1910, it was active every 30 minutes; five years later, the time between the eruptions was as much as six hours, and in 1916, the eruptions all but ceased. In 1935, a man-made channel was dug through the silica rim around the edge of the geyser vent. This ditch caused a lowering of the water table and a revival in activity. Gradually this channel became too clogged with silica and eruptions again became rare.

In 1981, the ditch was cleared again and eruptions could be stimulated, on special occasions, by the addition of soap. Due to environmental concerns, the practice of adding soap was seldom employed during the 1990s. During that time, Geysir seldom erupted. When it did erupt, it was spectacular, sending boiling water sometimes up to  into the air. On the Icelandic National Day, authorized government geologists would force an eruption. Initially, eruptions were taking place on average eight times a day. By July 2003, this activity had again decreased to around three times per day.

The nearby geyser Strokkur erupts much more frequently than Geysir, erupting to heights of up to  every few minutes. Strokkur's activity has also been affected by earthquakes, although to a lesser extent than the Great Geysir. Due to its eruption frequency, online photos and videos of Strokkur are regularly mislabelled as depicting Geysir. There are around thirty much smaller geysers and hot pools in the area, including one called Litli Geysir ('Little Geysir').

Descriptions of the Great Geysir and Strokkur have been given in many travel guides to Iceland published from the 18th century onwards. Together with Þingvellir and the Gullfoss waterfall, they are part of the Golden Circle that make up the most famous tourist route in the country.

Geysir was officially protected by the Ministry for the Environment and Natural Resources on 17 June 2020.

Ownership of the area

Until 1894, the Geysir area was owned by a local farmer. In that year the area was sold to James Craig (later Lord Craigavon), a whiskey distiller from Ulster and a future Prime Minister of Northern Ireland. Initially, he erected large fences around the site and an entrance fee was charged for visitors wishing to view the geysers. The following year, however, Craig appeared to tire of his project and gave the area as a present to a friend, E. Craig, who dropped the entrance fees. Later Craig's nephew Hugh Rogers inherited the site. In 1935, he sold the site to film director Sigurður Jónasson who subsequently donated it to the Icelandic people in perpetuity.

Gallery

See also
 Strokkur
 Volcanism of Iceland

References

Further reading
 The Great Geysir, Helgi Torfason of the Icelandic National Energy Authority, 1985 (no ISBN, but book available from the Geysir tourist center).

External links

 Information and photos of Geysir and the geothermal area
 Photos: 
 Videos: Iceland Travel Journal by Keith Chan
 

Southern Region (Iceland)
Geysers of Iceland
Volcanic systems of Iceland
West Volcanic Zone of Iceland
Pleistocene volcanoes